Zaube Parish is an administrative unit of Cēsis Municipality in the Vidzeme region of Latvia. The administrative centre is Zaube.

Towns, villages and settlements of Zaube Parish 
 Annas
 Bērzs
 Kliģene
 Zaube

External links 
 

Parishes of Latvia
Cēsis Municipality
Vidzeme